The 2020–21 Cal Poly Mustangs men's basketball team represented California Polytechnic State University in the 2020–21 NCAA Division I men's basketball season. The Mustangs, led by second-year head coach John Smith, played their home games at the Mott Athletics Center in San Luis Obispo, California as members of the Big West Conference.

Previous season
The Mustangs finished the 2019–20 season 7–23, 4–12 in Big West play to finish in last place. They failed to qualify for the Big West tournament (although the Big West tournament was ultimately cancelled due to the COVID-19 pandemic).

Roster

Schedule and results

|-
!colspan=12 style=| Non-conference regular season

|-
!colspan=9 style=| Big West regular season

|-
!colspan=9 style=| Big West tournament

Source

References

Cal Poly Mustangs men's basketball seasons
Cal Poly Mustangs
Cal Poly Mustangs men's basketball
Cal Poly Mustangs men's basketball